This is a list of seasons completed by Fort Wayne Komets in the teams' history across multiple franchises in the original International Hockey League (1952–99), United/International Hockey League (1999–2010), Central Hockey League (2010–12), and the ECHL (2012–present).

Records as of conclusion of 2020–21 season.

References

Fort Wayne Komets